Ness Flowers (birth unknown) is a Welsh former rugby union and professional rugby league footballer who played in the 1970s and 1980s. He captained the Welsh Schools Under-15's in 1971, and played for Wales Youth in 1973.

International honours
Ness Flowers won 4 caps for Wales (RL) in 1980–1984 while at Wigan, and Cardiff City (Bridgend) Blue Dragons 1-tries 3-points.

Note
Before the start of the 1984/85 season, Cardiff City Blue Dragons relocated from Ninian Park in Cardiff, to Coychurch Road Ground in Bridgend, and were renamed Bridgend Blue Dragons.

References

External links
Statistics at wigan.rlfans.com
(archived by web.archive.org) Neath Schools Rugby Union: A Plotted History
(archived by web.archive.org) Neath Schools' Players Who Have Played For Welsh Schools
Crynant RFC - About Us

Living people
Abercrave RFC players
Cardiff City Blue Dragons players
Crynant RFC players
Footballers who switched code
Huddersfield Giants players
Neath Athletic RFC players
Neath RFC players
Rugby league halfbacks
Wales national rugby league team players
Welsh rugby league players
Welsh rugby union players
Wigan Warriors players
Year of birth missing (living people)
Ystradgynlais RFC players